Robert Calvin Butler (born May 28, 1959 in Delray Beach, Florida), is a former professional American football player.  Butler played for Florida State University at the college level and was drafted in the first round of the NFL draft in 1981 by the Atlanta Falcons.  He played for 12 years for the Atlanta Falcons, his entire NFL career, retiring after the 1992 season.

Personal life
He has a wife named Cyrillyn and four sons; Brenton, Brice, Brelan and Brandel. Brenton played basketball at Fordham University and now plays professional basketball in Berlin, Germany for RSV Eintracht Stahnsdorf where he will be the team’s starting point guard, while Brice is a wide receiver in the NFL. 
His son Brelan is an accomplished video editor and still/film photographer.

1959 births
Living people
Sportspeople from Delray Beach, Florida
Players of American football from Florida
American football cornerbacks
Florida State Seminoles football players
Atlanta Falcons players